Peter Klashorst (born Peter van de Klashorst; born 11 February 1957) is a Dutch painter, sculptor, and photographer.

Biography

Klashorst was always based in the Tabakspanden on the Spuistraat in Amsterdam. But he's also produced works in cities such as Bangkok, Mombasa and Phnom Penh.

In 2011 he did one of his last self organised shows at the Tuol Sleng, S21 the former Khmer Rouge prison (Cambodia). In honour of the victims of the Khmer Rouge’s terror and genocide that took place from 1975 to 1979 in Cambodia, Peter Klashorst created an impressive and sometimes very confronting set of around 50 paintings. The show got world wide attention (The New York Times and Herald Tribune).

Prizes
1982 Johan en Titia Buning-Brongers Prize
1983 Royal Prize for Free Painting (Netherlands)

Work by Peter Klashorst

Bibliography
 Steef Davidson, red., Peter Klashorst, tekeningen: Poëzie explosie : 23-5, 30-5, 6-6 1979, Amsterdam, 1979
 Peter Klashorst; samenst. Timo van der Eng, Theo van der Hoeven; red.: Marleen Buddemeijer: Schilderen met acryl, Utrecht, 1997, 
 Mieke Rijnders, Geurt Imanse: Over schilderkunst; Pieter Holstein, René Daniels, Peter Klashorst, 1983.
 Paul Groot et al.: After nature, Amsterdam, 1989, catalogus uitgegeven ter gelegenheid van de tentoonstellingen van Bart Domburg, Jurriaan van Hall en Peter Klashorst in de galerieën Jurka, Hans Gieles en Torch te Amsterdam.
 Robert Vuijsje: King Klashorst, Amsterdam, 2005, 
 Peter Klashorst: Castles in the Air, Bangkok, 2010, 
 Peter Klashorst: Kunstkannibaal, 2012,

References

External links

1957 births
Living people
Dutch painters
Dutch male painters
Photographers from Amsterdam
Dutch sculptors
Dutch male sculptors
People from Velsen
People with HIV/AIDS
Dutch contemporary artists